Events from the year 1879 in Germany.

Incumbents

National level
 Kaiser – William I
 Chancellor – Otto von Bismarck

State level

Kingdoms
 King of Bavaria – Ludwig II of Bavaria
 King of Prussia – Kaiser William I
 King of Saxony – Albert of Saxony
 King of Württemberg – Charles I of Württemberg

Grand Duchies
 Grand Duke of Baden – Frederick I
 Grand Duke of Hesse – Louis IV
 Grand Duke of Mecklenburg-Schwerin – Frederick Francis II
 Grand Duke of Mecklenburg-Strelitz – Frederick William
 Grand Duke of Oldenburg – Peter II
 Grand Duke of Saxe-Weimar-Eisenach – Charles Alexander

Principalities
 Schaumburg-Lippe – Adolf I, Prince of Schaumburg-Lippe
 Schwarzburg-Rudolstadt – George Albert, Prince of Schwarzburg-Rudolstadt
 Schwarzburg-Sondershausen – Gonthier Frederick Charles II, Prince of Schwarzburg-Sondershausen
 Principality of Lippe – Woldemar, Prince of Lippe
 Reuss Elder Line – Heinrich XXII, Prince Reuss of Greiz
 Reuss Younger Line – Heinrich XIV, Prince Reuss Younger Line
 Waldeck and Pyrmont – George Victor, Prince of Waldeck and Pyrmont

Duchies
 Duke of Anhalt – Frederick I, Duke of Anhalt
 Duke of Brunswick – William, Duke of Brunswick
 Duke of Saxe-Altenburg – Ernst I, Duke of Saxe-Altenburg
 Duke of Saxe-Coburg and Gotha – Ernst II, Duke of Saxe-Coburg and Gotha
 Duke of Saxe-Meiningen – Georg II, Duke of Saxe-Meiningen

Events
 12 July – The German tariff of 1879 is voted for by a majority of 100 in the Reichstag.
 21 June – German company Linde was founded.
 31 May – German inventor Werner von Siemens demonstrates the first electric locomotive using an external power source at Berlin.
 7 October – A defensive alliance between Germany and Austria-Hungary is created by treaty.
 31 December – Karl Benz produces a two-stroke gas engine.

Births

 4 February – Wilhelm von Gayl, German politician (died 1945)
 25 February – Julius Falkenstein, German actor (died 1933)
 2 March – Johann Viktor Bredt, German jurist and politician (died 1940)
 8 March – Otto Hahn, German chemist and pioneer in the fields of radioactivity and radiochemistry (died 1968)
 9 March – Agnes Miegel, German poet (died 1964)
 10 March – Hans Luther, German politician, briefly Chancellor of Germany (died 1962)
 12 March – Alfred Abel, German actor (died 1837)
 14 March – Albert Einstein, German-Swiss theoretical physicist who developed the general theory of relativity (died 1955)
 27 April – Alfred Roth, German politician and writer (died 1948)
 31 May – F.W. Schröder-Schrom, German actor (died 1956)
 28 May – Albert Grzesinski, German politician (died 1948)
 6 September
 Max Schreck, German actor (died 1936)
 Joseph Wirth, German politician, former Chancellor of Germany (died 1956)
9 October – Max von Laue, German physicist (died 1960)
28 October – Martin Kirschner, German surgeon (died 1942)
29 October – Franz von Papen, German politician, Chancellor of Germany (died 1969)
1 November – Oskar Barnack, German inventor and German photographer  (died 1936)
14 December – Hermann Dietrich, German politician (died 1954)
16 December – Otto Ludwig Haas-Heye, German fashion designer (died 1959)

Deaths

24 January – Heinrich Geißler, German physicist (born 1814
23 February – Albrecht von Roon, Prussian soldier and statesman, minister of War from 1859 to 1873, (born 1803)
25 February – Karl Wilhelm von Willisen, Prussian general (born 1790)
13 March – Adolf Anderssen, German chess master (born 1818)
4 April – Heinrich Wilhelm Dove, German physicist and meteorologist (born 1803)
11 May – Bernhard Wolff, German newspaper publisher (born 1811)
15 May – Gottfried Semper, German architect (born 1803)
5 June – August Krönig, German chemist and physicist (born 1822)
7 September – George Westermann, German publisher (born 1810)
23 August – Alexander Duncker, German publisher (born 1813)
20 October – Bernhard Ernst von Bülow, German diplomat and politician (born 1815)
1 December – Franz Ittenbach, German painter (born 1813)

References

 
Years of the 19th century in Germany
Germany
Germany